Richard W. Unger (born in Huntington, West Virginia, in 1942) is a professor of Medieval History at the University of British Columbia and a specialist in European maritime history in the medieval period. He served as Second Vice-President of the Medieval Academy of America in 2011, First Vice-President in 2012, and President in 2013.

Publications
 Dutch Ship Design in the Fifteenth and Sixteenth Centuries (1973)
 Dutch Shipbuilding before 1800: Ships and Guilds (1978)
 The Ship in the Medieval Economy, 600-1600 (1980)
 The Art of Medieval Technology: Images of Noah the Shipbuilder (1991)
 Ships and Shipping in the North Sea and Atlantic, 1400-1800 (1997)
 A History of Brewing in Holland, 900-1900 (2001)
 Beer in the Middle Ages and the Renaissance (2004)
 Ships on Maps: Pictures of Power in Renaissance Europe (2010)
 Shipping and Economic Growth, 1350-1850 (2011)

 with Robert Allen, Global Commodity Prices Database

References

American maritime historians
American medievalists
Academic staff of the University of British Columbia
Living people
1942 births
Historians of the Netherlands
Historians of the Dutch Republic
Fellows of the Medieval Academy of America